Andrzej Stanisław Czerwiński (born 8 November 1954) is a Polish politician. He served as the Minister of State Treasury from June to November 2015.

He has been a member of the Sejm since 2001.

In 1979, he graduated from AGH University of Science and Technology.

From 1994 to 2001, he was the mayor of Nowy Sącz. In 2001, he was elected to the Sejm from the 14 Nowy Sącz district, from the Civic Platform list.

See also
Members of Polish Sejm 2005-2007
Members of Polish Sejm 2007-2011

External links
Andrzej Czerwiński - parliamentary page - includes declarations of interest, voting record, and transcripts of speeches.
Andrzej Czerwiński's private page in Polish

Members of the Polish Sejm 2005–2007
Members of the Polish Sejm 2001–2005
Civic Platform politicians
1954 births
Living people
Members of the Polish Sejm 2007–2011
Members of the Polish Sejm 2011–2015